Mount Mangin is located on the border of Alberta and British Columbia on the Continental Divide. It was named in 1918 after French general Charles Mangin.

See also
 List of peaks on the British Columbia–Alberta border

References

Three-thousanders of Alberta
Three-thousanders of British Columbia
Canadian Rockies